Bouwmeester is a Dutch occupational surname meaning "master builder". Variant forms are Boumeester, Bouwmeesters, and Bouwmeister. Notable people with the surname include:

Bouwmeester
Dirk Bouwmeester (born 1967), Dutch quantum physicist
Frans Bouwmeester (born 1940), Dutch footballer
Gerrit Bouwmeester (1892–1961), Dutch footballer
Hans Bouwmeester (born 1929), Dutch chess player
Jay Bouwmeester (born 1983), Canadian ice hockey player
Lea Bouwmeester (born 1979), Dutch politician
Lily Bouwmeester (1901–1993), Dutch theater and film actress, grandniece of Louis and Theo
Louis Bouwmeester (1842–1925), Dutch stage actor, brother of Theo
Marit Bouwmeester (born 1988), Dutch competitive sailor, 2017 World Sailor of the Year
 (1850–1939), Dutch stage actress, sister of Louis

Boumeester
Christine Boumeester (1904–1971), Dutch visual artist active in France
Huibert Boumeester (1900–1959), Dutch rower
 (1831–1894), Dutch commander of the Royal Netherlands East Indies Army
Marc Boumeester (born 1965), Dutch artist and art academic

References

Dutch-language surnames
Occupational surnames